Lansing Township may refer to:

 Lansing Township, Allamakee County, Iowa
 Lansing Charter Township, Michigan
 Lansing Township, Mower County, Minnesota
 Lansing Township, Towner County, North Dakota, in Towner County, North Dakota
 Lansing Township, Brown County, South Dakota, in Brown County, South Dakota

Township name disambiguation pages